Duval Love (born June 24, 1963) is a former American football guard. He played professionally for the Los Angeles Rams, Pittsburgh Steelers and Arizona Cardinals of the National Football League (NFL).

Biography
Love was born in Los Angeles, California. He played prep football at Fountain Valley High School in Fountain Valley, California. Love played college football at the University of California - Los Angeles.

He was drafted by the Los Angeles Rams in the 10th round (274th overall) of the 1985 NFL Draft, and played twelve seasons in the National Football League.

He was an offensive line coach at Whittier College from 2007–2008.

References

External links
 Pro-Football-Reference.Com
 NFL Enterprises LLC
 databaseFootball.com

1963 births
Living people
American football offensive linemen
Los Angeles Rams players
Pittsburgh Steelers players
Arizona Cardinals players
American Conference Pro Bowl players
UCLA Bruins football players